is the capital city of Toyama Prefecture, Japan, located on the coast of the Sea of Japan in the Chūbu region on central Honshū, about  north of the city of Nagoya and  northwest of Tokyo. , the city had an estimated population of 415,844 in 176,643 households, and a population density of 335 persons per km2.

Overview
The city has been designated an environmental model city by the national government for its efforts to reduce the emission of greenhouse gases.

Cityscapes

Geography
Located in the middle of its prefecture, Toyama is a seaside city by the coast of the Sea of Japan. Its municipal territory borders with the Gifu Prefecture and with the municipalities of Imizu, Namerikawa, Tonami, Nanto, Hida and Takayama.

The nearest towns are Imizu (west), and Namerikawa (east), both by the sea and part of the Toyama urban area.

Climate
Toyama has a humid subtropical climate (Köppen climate classification Cfa) with hot, humid summers and cool winters. Precipitation is abundant throughout the year, particularly in July, September and from November through January. Despite winter in Toyama being relatively mild, its position near the Sea of Japan places it within the heavy snow belt of Japan and on average  of snow falls each season, almost all of it from December through March, as well as occasionally experiencing some tremendous amounts of snowfall.

Demographics
Per Japanese census data, the population of Toyama has recently plateaued after a long period of growth.

Surrounding municipalities
Toyama Prefecture
Imizu
Namerikawa
Tonami
Nanto
Kamiichi
Tateyama
Funahashi
Nagano Prefecture
Ōmachi
Gifu Prefecture
Hida
Takayama

History

Early history
The area of present-day Toyama city was part of ancient Etchū Province. 
The Toyama Plain is good farmland and historically it was a point of strategic and traffic importance since prehistoric times.

Middle Ages
Sengoku period
During the Sengoku period, it was frequently a battlefield, coming under the control of warlord Sassa Narimasa, who built a castle town around Toyama Castle and channeled rivers to bringing about a flourishing agricultural industry.

Early Modern Ages
Edo period
The area subsequently became part of Kaga Domain under the Maeda clan during the Edo period, during which time a positive industrial promotion policy was implemented on the production of Chinese medicine and washi (Japanese paper).
Also, thanks to the improvement of kitamaebune sea transportation routes, these industries thrived and Toyama became known nationwide as the province of medicine.

Recent history

Late Modern Ages
Meiji period
After the Meiji Restoration, with the creation of the municipalities system, the city of Toyama was established on April 1, 1889, as one of the first 30 cities in Japan. Economically, the area developed heavy and chemical industries based on abundant hydroelectric electricity. 
Toyama has become one of the most influential cities on the Sea of Japan with its good water supply, drainage system and thriving agricultural, forestry, fishery, commercial and manufacturing industries.

Contemporary Ages
During World War II, Allied Prisoners of War (POWs) were sent to Toyama as forced labor. The city was almost completely destroyed on the night of August 1–2, 1945.  At the time of the bombing, the city was a center for aluminum, ball-bearing and special steel production. Left unscathed however, were the war-related factories just outside the city. The city during the time had a population of around 150,000 residents.  The city also held Kakure Kirishitan, or "Hidden Christians" in Japan, forced from Nagasaki into internment camps after the government tried to punish them for their Christian beliefs.
2005 mergers
On April 1, 2005, the towns of Ōsawano and Ōyama (both from Kaminiikawa District), the towns of Fuchū and Yatsuo, and the villages of Hosoiri and Yamada (all from Nei District) were merged into Toyama. Kaminiikawa District and Nei District were both dissolved as a result of this merger.

Government

Toyama has a mayor-council form of government with a directly elected mayor and a unicameral city legislature of 38 members.

External relations

Twin towns – sister cities

Toyama is twinned with:

International
Sister Cities

Friendship city

Economy
Hokuriku Electric Power Company (colloquially known as Hokuden), the regional power-supply monopoly, is based in Toyama. Bearing parts and industrial robot company Nachi-Fujikoshi and software company INTEC are also headquartered in Toyama.

Regional banks include Hokuriku Bank, First Bank of Toyama, and Toyama Bank.

Education

Colleges and universities
Toyama College
Toyama National College of Technology
Toyama Prefectural University
Toyama University of International Studies
University of Toyama

Primary and secondary education
Toyama has 65 public elementary schools and 26 public middle schools operated by the city government. There is also one public elementary school and one public middle school operated by the national government. The city has fourteen public high schools operated by the Toyama Prefectural Board of Education. and one public combined middle/high school operated by the national government. There are also seven private high schools. Toyama Shogyo High School is a commercial high school.

Transportation

Airways

Airports
Toyama Airport

Railways

High-speed rail
West Japan Railway Company (JR West)
Hokuriku Shinkansen：

Conventional lines
West Japan Railway Company (JR West)
Takayama Main Line：  -  -  -  -  -  -  -  -  - 
Central Japan Railway Company (JR Tōkai)
Takayama Main Line： -
 Ainokaze Toyama Railway
Ainokaze Toyama Railway Line：- Kureha - Toyama - Higashi-Toyama - Mizuhashi -
Toyama Chihō Railway
Main Line： -  -  - 
Kamidaki Line： -  -  -   -  -  -  -  -  -  -  -  -  
Tateyama Line：   -

Tramways
Toyama Chihō Railway
Toyama Light Rail Toyamakō Line
Toyama City Tram Line

Roads

Expressway
Hokuriku Expressway

Japan National Route

Seaways

Seaport
Port of Toyama

Local attractions

 Botanic Gardens of Toyama
 Toyama International Conference Center
 Toyama Castle
 Toyamaken Gokoku Shrine
 Museum of Modern Art of Toyama
 Toyama Athletic Recreation Park Stadium, home of Toyama's representative in the J.League, Kataller Toyama football club
 Toyama Glass Art Museum
Yasuda Castle ruins, National Historic Site
Sugusaka Site, Japanese Paleolithic period site, National Historic Site
Kitadai Site, Jomon period site, National Historic Site
Ōzuka-Senbōyama Sites, Yayoi period settlement ruins and Kofun, National Historic Site
Kurobe Dam

Culture

Festivals and events
 Toyama Chindon Contest (Toyama Band of musical sandwichmen contest) – proposed by the Toyama Chamber of Commerce in 1955 and is held annually in early April. This event has become a festival, and many bands of sandwichmen (men wearing sandwich boards for advertisements) participate, attracting many tourists every year.
 Kaze No Bon – held annually on September 1 to 3, in the Yatsuo region.

References

External links

 Toyama City official website 
 Toyama City official website 
 Toyama City's Website for foreign people Visit Toyama
 Toyama Castle

 
Cities in Toyama Prefecture
Port settlements in Japan
Populated coastal places in Japan
Environmental model cities